Abu Sa'id Bahadur Khan (June 2, 1305 – December 1, 1335) (Persian,), also spelt Abusaid Bahador Khan, Abu Sa'id Behauder (Modern , Abu sayid Baghatur Khan,  in modern Mongolian), was the ninth ruler (c. 1316 – 1335) of the Ilkhanate, a division of the Mongol Empire that encompassed the present day countries of Iran, Azerbaijan, Georgia, and Armenia, as well as portions of Iraq, Turkey, Afghanistan, and Pakistan.

Early life 
He was born on 2 June 1305, near Ujan, Tabriz to Öljaitü and Hajji Khatun. He became his father's heir after deaths of his elder brothers. He was assigned to govern Khorasan and Mazandaran in 1315 with Uyghur noble Amir Sevinch as his guardian.

Reign 
He was brought back to Soltaniyeh by Sevinch in December, 1316. But his coronation was delayed until April, May, July or August 1317 due to a conflict between Chupan and Sevinch. Abu Said employed Rashid-al-Din Hamadani and Taj Al-Din Ali Shah Gilani as his viziers. However, viziers were at odds and it led to Hamadani's dismissal in October 1317. Amir Sevinch also died in January 1318, leaving young Abu Sa'id to hands of Chupan. Although Chupan recalled Hamadani to serve in court, Gilani accused him and his son Ibrahim Izzaddin, the cupbearer of poisoning late ilkhan Öljaitü, which led to their eventual execution on 13 July 1318 near Abhar. This left the emir Chupan as the de facto ruler of Ilkhanate. Following years were tumultuous for Abu Sa'id's reign.

Golden Horde invasion and rebellion of amirs 
Golden Horde khan Özbeg invaded Azerbaijan in 1319 in coordination with Chagatayid prince Yasa'ur who pledged loyalty to Öljaitü earlier but revolted in 1319. Prior to that, he had Amir Yasaul, governor of Mazandaran killed by his subordinate Begtüt. Abu Sa'id was forced to send Amir Husayn Jalayir to face Yasa'ur and while himself marched against Özbeg. Özbeg was defeated shortly thanks to reinforcements by Chupan, while Yasa'ur was killed by Kebek in 1320. Several amirs didn't come to aid of Abu Sa'id, therefore they were subject to punishment by Chupan. Yet another revolt started in 1319, this time by Keraite emirs Irinjin, a former governor of Diyar Bakr and Qurumishi, governor of Georgia who were among the amirs rebuked by Chupan. Qurumishi and Irinjin were related in addition to both being from Keraite tribe - Irinjin was father of Öljaitü's widow Qutluqshah Khatun and a son-in-law to Tekuder, while Qurumshi's father Alinaq Noyan was also a son-in-law of Tekuder. 40.000 strong rebel army caught Chupan with his two sons and 2000 strong entourage unguarded near Georgia and caused him to flee. Chupan arrived in Tabriz and later went to Abu Sa'id to report. Hearing news, Ilkhan moved against rebels and met them near Mianeh.

A decisive battle was fought on 20 June 1319 near Mianeh with Ilkhanate victory. This victory granted young Abu Sa'id the honorific titles of Baghatur (from Mongolian "баатар", meaning "hero, warrior") and al-Sultan al-Adil (the just Sultan). In total 36 emirs and 7 khatuns, including Amir Toqmaq, Qurumishi, Princess Könchek (daughter of Tekuder), her husband Irinjin and their sons Sheykh Ali and Vafadar were executed while Qurumushi's son Abdurrahman fled to Özbeg. Chupan subsequently was given hand of Sati Beg, sister of Abu Sa'id on 6 September 1319, thus growing his family's power greatly. His sons Timurtash, Shaikh Mahmud, Hasan and Demasq Kaja were given governorships of Anatolia, Georgia, Khorasan and Azerbaijan respectively.

Chupanid rebellion 
However, Timurtash rose in rebellion in 1322, claiming to be the Mahdi. Chupan went to obtain his surrender personally and even managed to get reappointment to the post by Abu Sa'id. Abu Sa'id sometime fell in love with Baghdad Khatun, one of emir Chupan's daughters. The emir's efforts to keep Abu Sa'id from marrying his daughter, who was still married to Hasan Buzurg (another powerful kingmaker of the era), did not help the situation. Abu Said approached Chupan in 1325, claiming her unsuccessfully. Chupan sent his daughter and son-in-law to Karabakh instead while himself went against Özbeg and Tarmashirin who invaded Azerbaijan and Khorasan respectively. Using opportunity, on 25 August 1327, Abu Sa'id had one of Chupan's sons, Demasq Kaja, killed, apparently for his activities with a former concubine of Öljaitü's. Hearing this, Chupan marched against Abu Sa'id seeking revenge. But many emirs including Muhammad Beg, uncle of Abu Sa'id deserted him near Ray, taking 30.000 soldier with them, leaving Chupan no choice but to retreat to Herat. However he was soon strangled to death by Kartid ruler Ghiyath-uddin under orders of Abu Sa'id in 1327. His daughter soon forced to divorce Hasan Buzurg and marry Abu Sa'id. In compensation, Hasan was awarded former post of Chupan, rising to be new commander-in-chief of Ilkhanid army.

Later years 
Now ruling personally, Abu Sa'id invited Ghiyas al-Din, son of Rashid al-Din to be his vizier. Narin Taghai (a nephew of Taghachar and grandson of Kitbuqa) who was responsible for Chupan's downfall and Abu Sa'id's uncle Ali Padshah were granted governorates of Khorasan and Baghdad respectively. However Ghiyas al-Din's enforcement of central authority didn't coincide with other amirs' plans. Narin Taghai left his post in 1329 to kill Ghiyas al-Din. He was aided by emirs Ali Padshah and Misr Khwaja. Narin Taghay was executed in September or 29 July 1329, ending another serious threat. Later Hasan Buzurg too was accused of treason with Baghdad Khatun in 1332 but reinstated as governor of Anatolia later. However, Abu Sa'id divorced from Baghdad and married to her niece Dilshad Khatun in 1333.

In 1334, Abu Sa'id appointed Amir Musaffar Inaq as governor of Shiraz to the resentment of Sharaf al-Din Mahmudshah Inju, founder of Injuid dynasty, who was ruling Fars region for a while since Chupan's death. He pursued Musaffar to Abu Sa'id's tent, accidentally making attempt on his life. Mahmudshah's rebellious act got him imprisoned.

Foreign relations 
Abu Sa'id signed a commercial treaty with Venice in 1320, while also granting them to establish oratories throughout the empire. He also improved relations with Mamluk Egypt the same year, signing a treaty. He is also known to have corresponded with Muhammad b. Tughluq of Delhi Sultanate.

Death 
Abu Sa'id had to face another invasion by Özbeg in 1335 and left to face him, but died on his way in Karabakh, on night of 30 November to 1 December 1335. His body was taken to Soltaniyeh and buried there. According to Ibn Battuta, he was poisoned by Baghdad Khatun on grounds of jealousy. He may have been a victim to Black Death as well.

Abu Sa'id died without an heir or an appointed successor, thus leaving the Ilkhanate vulnerable. This led to clashes of the major families, such as the Chupanids, the Jalayirids, and new movements like the Sarbadars. On his return to Persia, the great voyager Ibn Battuta was amazed to discover that the realm which had seemed to be so mighty only twenty years before, had dissolved so quickly. The Ilkhanate lost cohesion after the death of Abu Sa'id, and that of his successor, Arpa Ke'un, becoming a plethora of little kingdoms run by Mongols, Turks, and Persians.

Viziers 

 Rashid-al-Din Hamadani (1317)
 Taj Al-Din Ali Shah (1317-1323)
 Rukn al-Din Sa'in (1323-1327)
 Ghiyas al-Din ibn Rashid al-Din (1327-1335)

Family
Consorts

Abu Sa'id married six times from different clans including Borjigin, Oirat and Suldus:
Uljay Qutlugh Khatun (m. 5 July 1317), daughter of Ghazan and Bulughan Khatun, and widow of his elder brother Bastam;
Baghdad Khatun (m. 1327 – div. 1333, executed December 16, 1335), daughter of Amir Chupan, and former wife of Hasan Buzurg;
Malika Khatun, daughter of Tuq b. Sulaimish b. Tengiz Güregen;
Dilshad Khatun (m. 1333, died 27 December 1351), daughter of Demasq Kaja and Tursin Khatun, daughter of Irinjin Kurkan and Konchak Khatun, daughter of Tekuder;
Adil Shah Khatun (died 7 May 1332, near Ujan), daughter of Tukal ibn Essen Qutlugh (Governor of Khorasan, d. 10 October 1318);
Sarqadaq Khatun, daughter of Dawlat Shah Suldus, relative of Amir Chupan;

Daughter
Abu Sa'id had one daughter
A daughter (born 18 May 1336) - with Dilshad Khatun;

Personality 
According to Ibn Battuta, Abu Sa'id was one of "the most beautiful of God's creatures". Being a cultured ruler, he was the only Il-Khan to be known to author poetry as well as music.

Ancestry

References

Sources 
 Atwood, Christopher P. (2004). The Encyclopedia of Mongolia and the Mongol Empire. Facts on File, Inc. .

External links
 
 
 

1305 births
1335 deaths
Il-Khan emperors
Mongol Empire Muslims
14th-century monarchs in Asia
14th-century deaths from plague (disease)